Demolition Derby is a racing video game developed by Bally Midway and released in arcades in 1984.

History
In 1970, Jerry Lawson joined Fairchild Semiconductor in San Francisco as an applications engineering consultant within their sales division. While there, he created an early coin-operated arcade game called Demolition Derby in his garage. Completed in early 1975 using Fairchild's new F8 microprocessors, Demolition Derby was among the earliest microprocessor-driven games.

Gameplay
The player takes part in a demolition derby. Hit other cars in the radiator to damage them, while avoiding being hit in one's own radiator. Power-ups include wrenches, screwdrivers and car keys.

A notable feature of the multiplayer mode was the ability to enter a game while it is in progress; the message "CAR ENTERING DERBY" would appear on screen.

Reception
Demolition Derby was listed in the book 1001 Video Games You Must Play Before You Die.

See also
Destruction Derby (1975), also released by Chicago Coin under the name Demolition Derby

References

External links

1984 video games
Arcade video games
Midway video games
Arcade-only video games
Racing video games
Vehicular combat games
Video games developed in the United States